Forever Warriors Forever United is the thirteenth studio album by the German female heavy metal singer Doro, released on August 17, 2018 through Nuclear Blast Records. This is Doro's first double album, released separately as split albums, as well as a double package. The album is dedicated to Lemmy Kilmister. The first single "All For Metal" contains several guest vocalists such as Chuck Billy, Jeff Waters, Johan Hegg, Mille Petrozza, and Sabaton. "If I Can't Have You, No One Will", which has a duet with Amon Amarth bellower Johan Hegg, was released as the 2nd Single. The 3rd and 4th singles were "Lift Me Up" and "It Cuts So Deep" respectfully. Five music videos were produced in promotion for the record's release: "All For Metal", "It Cuts So Deep", "If I Can Not Have - No One Will", "Freunde Furs Leben" and "It Cuts So Deep".

Background 

When talking about the album Doro explained that:

Critical Reception  
Reception of the album has been generally positive upon its release, with many welcoming her return. 

A review from Blabbermouth gave a review stating that "'Forever Warriors, Forever United' is like that reliable MOTÖRHEAD album you're gonna buy automatically—just because." They spoke fondly of tracks like 'All For Metal', 'Turn it Up', 'Resistance', 'Blood, Sweat and Rock 'n' Roll', 'Fight Through the Fire', and 'Backstage to Heaven'. However, they disliked the length of the album, stating that; 

Another reviewer from SonicPerspectives wrote that the album was more of a mixed bag.

Track listing

Personnel 
Band members
Doro Pesch – vocals
Bas Maas – guitars
Luca Princiotta – guitars, keyboards
Nick Douglas – bass
Johnny Dee – drums

Additional musicians
Mille Petrozza (Kreator) - backing vocals "All for Metal"
Chuck Billy (Testament) - backing vocals "All for Metal"
Sabaton - backing vocals "All for Metal"
Warrel Dane (Nevermore, Sanctuary) - backing vocals "All for Metal"
Jeff Waters (Annihilator) - backing vocals "All for Metal"
Ross the Boss - "All for Metal"
Rolf "Rock'n'Rolf" Kasparek (Running Wild) - "All for Metal"
DeTraktor - backing vocals "All for Metal"
Doug Aldrich (Whitesnake), Dio, Dead Daisies) - guitars (solo) "Heartbroken"
Tommy Bolan (Warlock) - guitars "All for Metal"
Johan Hegg (Amon Amarth) - duet on "If I Can't Have You, No One Will" and backing vocals on "All for Metal"
Helge Schneider - saxophone on "Backstage to Heaven"

Production
Doro Pesch - layout, producer
Bas Maas - producer
Luca Princiotta - engineering, producer
Nick Mitchell - engineering, producer
Andreas Bruhn - engineering, mixing, producer, arrangements (strings)
Mike "Metal" Goldberg - engineering, mixing
Ralph Quick - engineering, mixing
Jochen Kux - engineering
Carsten Steffens - engineering
Jens Dreesen - mastering
Thomas Ewerhard - layout
Geoffrey Gillespie - cover art

References

External links 

Doro (musician) albums
2012 albums
Nuclear Blast albums